Seth R. Marder is an American physical chemist best known for his development of the quantum mechanical foundations of nonlinear electro-optics in organic dyes and materials.

Education
Marder obtained his Bachelor of Science degree in Chemistry from Massachusetts Institute of Technology in 1978 and doctorate from Wisconsin-Madison in 1985 after which he was a postdoctoral researcher at Oxford from 1985-1987.

Career
He then moved to work on the technical staff of the NASA Jet Propulsion Laboratory (JPL) at California Institute of Technology (Caltech) from 1987–1998, where he was awarded the Lew Allen Award for Excellence in 1993. From 1998 to 2003 Marder was Professor of Chemistry and Optical Sciences at the University of Arizona before moving to Georgia Institute of Technology where he served as a Regents Professor in the Department of Chemistry and Biochemistry.

Marder serves as the chair of the editorial board of the academic journal Materials Horizons.

As of 2021, Marder accepted a position at the University of Colorado Boulder in a joint appointment as a Professor in the Department of Chemical and Biological Engineering and Department of Chemistry. He also serves as the Director of CU Boulder's Renewable and Sustainable Energy Institute.

Research interests
His research interests are in the development of materials for nonlinear optics, applications of organic dyes for photonic, display, electronic and medical applications, and organometallic chemistry. He currently studies polymers, nanostructures, and biomolecular solids.

Fellowships
He is a Fellow of the Optical Society of America, the Society of Photo-optical Instrumentation Engineers (SPIE), the American Physical Society, the Royal Society of Chemistry and the American Association for the Advancement of Science.

References

Year of birth missing (living people)
Living people
University of Wisconsin–Madison alumni
Massachusetts Institute of Technology School of Science alumni
University of Arizona faculty
Georgia Tech faculty
Jet Propulsion Laboratory faculty
American physical chemists
Fellows of Optica (society)
Fellows of the American Physical Society
Fellows of the Royal Society of Chemistry
Fellows of the American Association for the Advancement of Science